Torriente is a surname. Notable people with the surname include:

Celso Golmayo Torriente (1879–1924), Cuban–Spanish chess master
Cosme de la Torriente y Peraza (1872–1956), Cuban soldier, politician, lawyer and statesman
Cristóbal Torriente (1893–1938), Cuban baseball player
Dario de Urra Torriente (born 1939), Cuban diplomat
Idel Torriente (born 1986), Cuban amateur boxer 
Manuel Golmayo Torriente (1883–1973), Cuban-Spanish chess master
Pablo de la Torriente Brau (1901–1936), Cuban writer, journalist and soldier